Leave It to Lamas is an American reality series broadcast on the E! cable television network that aired in 2009 starring Lorenzo Lamas and his family.

Synopsis
The show documents the lives of Lorenzo Lamas, his ex-wife Michele Smith, their two children, Shayne and AJ Lamas, and Michele's daughter with ex-husband Craig Pike, Dakota. The show portrays the family's careers, dating, and personal lives.

Cast
Lorenzo Lamas – The star of Falcon Crest and Renegade is the father of A.J. and Shayne Lamas, and ex-husband of Michele Smith. The show follows him as he starts dating, but primarily deals with his interaction with daughter Shayne.
Shayne Lamas – Shayne is a 25-year-old model and actress. She is looking to move forward in her acting and modeling career with advice from her father and her siblings on the reality show. Shayne is currently single and "looking for love."
 AJ Lamas – AJ is a 27-year-old actor. AJ and Lorenzo have a poor relationship due to Lorenzo's belief that AJ and Lorenzo's fourth ex-wife, Shauna Sand, had engaged in a sexual relationship. Though AJ denies this, he and Lorenzo still engage in a public family feud.
 Michele Smith – A former publicist with PMK-N.Y., is the #2 ex-wife of Lorenzo Lamas. She is the mother of AJ, and Shayne (both fathered by Lorenzo) and Dakota Pike (fathered by ex-husband Craig Pike). Michele is extremely funny, and is generally seen as a sweet empty nester.
 Dakota Pike – Dakota is the 17-year-old half-sister/roommate of AJ and Shayne. She is an occasional actress and aspiring singer recording her debut album.
 dogs Madison and Riley – Madison is Shayne's 2 year old Westie Bichon. Riley (aka Little Man) is Michele's 3-year-old tea cup Maltese.

Episodes

References

External links
 
 

2009 American television series debuts
2000s American reality television series
2009 American television series endings
E! original programming
English-language television shows
Television shows set in Los Angeles
Television series by Warner Horizon Television